This list of museums in Norfolk, England contains museums which are defined for this context as institutions (including nonprofit organizations, government entities, and private businesses) that collect and care for objects of cultural, artistic, scientific, or historical interest and make their collections or related exhibits available for public viewing. Also included are non-profit art galleries and university art galleries.  Museums that exist only in cyberspace (i.e., virtual museums) are not included.

Many of these museums are members of Museums Norfolk (formerly the Museums in Norfolk Group). Museums Norfolk is the representative organisation for museums in the county, and its membership includes museums from both Norfolk County Council's Museums Service (NMS) and independent museums. Details of each member museum, opening times and events are given on its website www.museumsnorfolk.org.uk.

Defunct museums
 Dragon Hall, Norwich, closed to visitors in 2015
 Fenland Aviation and West Norfolk Museum, near Walsoken, closed to visitors in October 2022.
 Iceni Village & Museums, Cockley Cley, reconstruction of the type of village occupied by a British tribe, the Iceni, closed in 2014
 Inspire Discovery Centre, Norwich, closed in 2011
 Litcham Village Museum, Litcham
 Norfolk's Golden Fleece Heritage Museum, Worstead
 Town House Museum, King's Lynn, closed in 2011
 Yesterday's World, Great Yarmouth, closed in 2014

See also
 :Category:Tourist attractions in Norfolk

References

 Norfolk Museums & Archaeology Service 
 Norfolk Heritage - the website of Museums Norfolk

 
History of Norfolk
Norfolk
Museums